Bayandun is a sum (district) of Dornod Province in eastern Mongolia. In 2009, its population was 2,936.

References 

Districts of Dornod Province